Stella Maris School is an English Medium Convent School which is located in Vadgaon Sheri in Pune, Maharashtra, India. It is a private school. The school is managed by the Society of St. Ursula. The school is recognised by the Government of Maharashtra, but is not a grant-in-aid school. The syllabus followed is that prescribed by the Department of Education, Maharashtra State. It is a Co-Ed. School.

History
In 1953, some Swiss Sisters of the Ursulines order came to India to continue the work that their founder had begun. The three schools in Pune, namely St. Ursula High School in Nigdi, Stella Maris School in Vadgaon Sheri, K. Bajaj School and St. Ursula School at Kankavavli are Sister Institutions.

Background and campus
The school is engaged in providing education to students from L.K.G. to std tenth. There are 42 teachers providing education to 1918 students. Various sports & cultural programs are held round the year for extra circulars activities in the school. Each class is divided into four sections A, B, C and 'D , which includes an average of 60 students in each section.

The campus of the school is divided into two divisions, Primary and Secondary. Primary includes levels L.K.G. to Std fifth and Secondary includes levels Std sixth to tenth.

Primary Section
The primary section includes classes from L.K.G. to class four. The headmistress of the section is Sr. Ida who is also the vice-principal of the school. The teaching staff of primary section includes eighteen teachers and 1080 students. The staff is different from the staff in the secondary section, in exception of the teachers of L.K.G. and U.K.G. who teaches subjects like Drawing, Craft and Needle-Work to the senior students in afternoon. The primary section has its own play ground for children during break timings or P.T. times.

Secondary Section
The secondary section includes classes from class five to class ten. The headmistress of the section is Sr. Jolly'' who is also the principal of the school. The teaching staff includes twenty-three teachers and around 900 students. The section includes two playgrounds which makes a total of three grounds for the school. In the two grounds one is a football ground and the other is a basketball court.

Houses
The students in the school are divided into different houses. In the primary section the students are divided into five houses each named after a flower. The houses are:
 Rose
 Lotus
 Lily
 Daisy
 Jasmine

In secondary section the students are divided into four houses each named after a colour. The houses are:

See also 
List of schools in Pune

References

Schools in Pune
Private schools in Maharashtra
1953 establishments in Bombay State
Educational institutions established in 1953